Benjamin Harrison (December 18, 1888 – August 13, 1960) was a United States district judge of the United States District Court for the Southern District of California.

Education and career

Born in San Bernardino, California, Harrison read law to enter the bar in 1914. He was in private practice in Needles, California from 1917 to 1923, and in San Bernardino from 1923 to 1937, and was city attorney of Needles from 1918 to 1937. He was also a member of the Board of Education of San Bernardino from 1928 to 1932. He was the United States Attorney for the Southern District of California from 1937 to 1940.

Federal judicial service

On June 11, 1940, Harrison was nominated by President Franklin D. Roosevelt to a new seat on the United States District Court for the Southern District of California created by 54 Stat. 219. He was confirmed by the United States Senate on June 22, 1940, and received his commission on June 26, 1940. He served as Chief Judge in 1959, and continued to serve on the court until his death on August 13, 1960.

References

Sources
 

1888 births
1960 deaths
United States Attorneys for the Southern District of California
Judges of the United States District Court for the Southern District of California
United States district court judges appointed by Franklin D. Roosevelt
20th-century American judges
People from San Bernardino, California
People from Needles, California
United States federal judges admitted to the practice of law by reading law